New Romance for Kids is a Canadian DIY independent record label founded in Montreal. Started in 2001, the label is owned and operated by  Mathieu Lachapelle, Guillaume Boudreau-Monty and Jason Bissessar.

References 
Citations

External links 
 New Romance for Kids official website
 New Romance for Kids on Myspace

Record labels established in 2001
Canadian independent record labels
Companies based in Montreal